Burke is a city in southwestern Angelina County, Texas, United States. The population was 737 at the 2010 census.

History 
Burke was founded in 1881 when construction of the Houston, East and West Texas Railway reached the western edge of Bradley Prairie. The town was originally named Rhodes for general store owner W. R. Rhodes and postmaster H. R. Rhodes, but about 1885 it was renamed for Edmund L. Burke, a railroad employee who directed the railroad survey.

By 1885 Burke had three sawmills, three cotton gins, a church, and a school. In 1886 it received a post office, which remained there until 1955. By 1888 it had a larger school, three general stores, a drugstore, a sawmill, a dentist and watchmaker, and a Farmers' Alliance store. In 1897 Burke had an estimated population of 650. By 1904 Burke's population had declined to 161, due to the rise of Lufkin, eight miles north, as an industrial center for the county. However, by 1915 the population had risen to 200, and by 1925 it reached 300. The Burke Methodist Church was organized in 1899–1900, and the First Baptist Church of Burke in 1905.

Education was a priority at Burke. The first school, a one-room structure, was enlarged to three rooms within a few years. Voters approved a bond in 1910 to erect a brick schoolhouse for grades one through seven. The brick building was torn down in 1935 and replaced with a larger schoolhouse built with Works Progress Administration funds. The Burke Independent School District consolidated with the Diboll schools in 1964.

Burke was incorporated as a city in 1966, and a municipal water system was constructed. Burke had a population of 322 in 1980 and 314 in 1990.

Geography

Burke is located at  (31.235704, –94.764849).

Demographics

As of the census of 2000, there were 315 people, 114 households, and 85 families residing in the city. The population density was 501.5 people per square mile (193.1/km2). There were 138 housing units at an average density of 219.7 per square mile (84.6/km2). The racial makeup of the city was 91.43% White, 1.27% African American, 1.90% Native American, 3.81% from other races, and 1.59% from two or more races. Hispanic or Latino of any race were 22.22% of the population.

There were 114 households, out of which 36.8% had children under the age of 18 living with them, 59.6% were married couples living together, 10.5% had a female householder with no husband present, and 25.4% were non-families. 23.7% of all households were made up of individuals, and 12.3% had someone living alone who was 65 years of age or older. The average household size was 2.76 and the average family size was 3.28.

In the city, the population was spread out, with 27.0% under the age of 18, 12.4% from 18 to 24, 30.2% from 25 to 44, 16.2% from 45 to 64, and 14.3% who were 65 years of age or older. The median age was 31 years. For every 100 females, there were 86.4 males. For every 100 females age 18 and over, there were 88.5 males.

The median income for a household in the city was $29,821, and the median income for a family was $34,375. Males had a median income of $31,250 versus $18,472 for females. The per capita income for the city was $12,033. About 15.7% of families and 14.4% of the population were below the poverty line, including 9.9% of those under age 18 and 17.4% of those age 65 or over.

Education
Burke is a part of the Diboll Independent School District.  A very small portion is within the Lufkin ISD.

Climate
The climate in this area is characterized by hot, humid summers and generally mild to cool winters.  According to the Köppen Climate Classification system, Burke has a humid subtropical climate, abbreviated "Cfa" on climate maps.

References

External links
 A Town That Might Have Been, the Burke History Project
 The Handbook of Texas Online

Cities in Angelina County, Texas
Cities in Texas
Populated places established in 1881
1881 establishments in Texas